An elevator consultant is someone who specializes in the design, testing and maintenance inspection of elevators, escalators, moving walkways and many other conveyances that move people. They are not to be confused with elevator mechanics. Consultants (unlike mechanics) do not normally perform work on conveyances. Some elevator consultants may also work as private elevator inspectors. Some jurisdictions may accept independent third party inspectors for certified inspections while others may employ their own inspectors.

Job duties
Elevator consultants work for property owners, developers, building tenants, architects, engineers, municipal code enforcement bodies and insurance companies for the following purposes:
Identifying elevator system options for Developers in order to create the most efficient transportation solution for a specific building.
Designing elevator systems for Architects and Engineers, including elevator bank traffic studies, component specifications, and providing blueprint drawings for incorporation into contract bid packages.
Performing ASME A17.1 QEI-1 certified inspections under the authority of the Municipal Code Enforcement Officials (in the USA).
Providing maintenance audits to verify contract compliance with the maintenance provisions of the contract, confirming compliance with the ASME A17.1 maintenance provisions, and determining the long term viability of the equipment as required by the Original Equipment Manufacturer's (OEM) maintenance requirements.
 Enforcing Municipal code upon conveyances, ensuring the public's safety, although these inspections are frequently performed by elevator inspectors employed by or authorized by public entities.
Expert testimony for lawsuits involving conveyances.

Elevator Consultants can be a helpful resource to those who are involved in the design of new buildings and the management of existing buildings. An Elevator Consultant will typically not perform work on a conveyance in order to ensure their independence. In some instances, they may be authorized to address serious hazards as part of their ethical responsibility to the public by removing a conveyance from service, until potential dangers can be addressed.

Education background
There are no specific university programs to train an Elevator Consultant, although many are trained in mechanical and electrical engineering. Many Elevator consultants are former employees of major manufacturers, but may have limited technical background in the design and construction of buildings. Elevator consultants most frequently gain skills through experience in a variety of conveyance-related work. A qualified Elevator Consultant should have specific experience in elevator construction and modernization, familiarity with model codes and standards, and familiarity with local building codes, laws and regulations. Some elevator consultants may also perform certified inspections, after qualifying and obtaining QEI-1 credentials in the States or Provinces where independent inspectors are authorized. (see elevator inspector)

Although some elevator consultants may be certified as QEI Inspectors, verifying qualifications of a consultant can be difficult. One organization called the International Association of Elevator Consultants, (IAEC) sets standards for experience and certification of independence, in order to become a member, which is intended to minimize concerns with the consultant's qualifications.

IAEC has recently made available a special certification, the Qualified Elevator Consultant, (QEC). There are currently 10 QECs in the world. Included in this list are representatives from the US, Canada, and India. Requirements for attaining QEC certification are found in the IAEC bylaws and include, among other things, ten years of verifiable elevator consulting experience and extensive industry involvement.

Some elevator manufacturers may also employ trained staff in technical sales and support engineering departments to assist in the design of elevator and escalator systems. Elevator consultants however, are generally employed as independent contractors by architects, engineers or directly by property owners for large scale building projects involving multiple technical disciplines. A design team for a major building project will often require a specific technical design experience by professional consultants, such as a kitchen consultant, lighting consultant, audio-visual consultant, landscape architect, and/or am elevator consultant to supplement the technical work of the architect and engineer. It is expected by the Owner that these design teams will avoid using consultants that represent a specific manufacturer to minimize the potential, or even the appearance of a conflict of interest.

The demands of the real estate business have promoted the growth of the elevator consulting field, largely because one of the most expensive parts of the elevator is the space taken in the building. Careful design of the elevator system can both minimize the cost of elevators and improve the efficiency of the building. Elevators and escalators can add a substantial initial and long-term investment to a building. A qualified independent elevator consultant is common in large campus type environments such as colleges, hotel chains and malls where standardization of materials and methods is desirable.

Elevator inspector
In general, elevator and escalator inspectors in the US and Canada are required to carry a current Qualified Elevator Inspector's (QEI) certification. In some jurisdictions, equivalent certification may be offered through State or Provincial authorities; however the American Society of Mechanical Engineers (ASME) requires QEI certification as the sole standard for proof of qualification (See: ASME A17.1 Safety Code for Elevators and Escalators). Increasingly, US States are using authorized independent inspectors to perform periodic inspections, witnessing annual tests that in the past would have been the work of State employees. In many States, a list of qualified competitive inspection companies are made available to private property owners to select from.

QEI Certification is available from one of three organizations approved by the ASME. Qualification to obtain QEI certification includes extensive previous experience in the field of elevators (and other conveyances), experience working as an inspector and passing a comprehensive written examination. An application is available from the National Association of Elevator Safety Authorities, maintaining current certification that includes meeting standards for continuing education, required to be renewed annually. The qualifications for QEI Inspectors and QEIS (inspector supervisors) and Certifying Organizations and performance standards for inspectors can be found in the ASME standard QEI-1 Standard for the Qualification of Elevators and Inspectors. Inspectors are required by the ASME standards to avoid situations that are considered unethical, such as conflicts of interest that include performing or witnessing inspections and test on conveyances that they or their employer have financial interest in. Inspections are performed using the ASME A17.2 Guide for Inspection of Elevators, Escalators and Moving Walks as well as other relevant reference standards and local building codes. In most cases, inspectors are required to verify that conveyances meet the standards that they were originally installed under, however some jurisdictions may require conveyances that meet more current standards, including US federal authorities that often require conveyances meeting the minimum standards of the ASME A17.3 Safety Code for Existing Elevators and Escalators. Additionally, all conveyances are required to meet current safety standards for maintenance and inspection regardless of the date of original installation.

ASME A17.1 Appendix N lists the recommended frequency for conveyance inspections and tests. Each Authority Having Jurisdiction has authority to determine the frequency for inspection in their jurisdiction. However, the International Code Council, the most commonly adopted national standard for building codes in the US, adopts the recommended frequency of Appendix N in its entirety. In general, a QEI certified elevator inspector is required to perform a periodic inspection on passenger and freight elevators and escalators every six months. Additionally, each conveyance is required to have a series of safety tests completed annually by qualified elevator maintenance personnel (as defined by ASME A17.1). This test is required to be witnessed by a QEI inspector that does not have a personal financial interest in, or be employed by someone that has a financial interest in the results of the test. (This would be considered an unethical conflict of interest) In summary, most elevators, escalators, platform lifts and other conveyances that are permitted to carry people, are required to have two periodic inspections and one annual test each year. Additionally, all new and renovated elevators require an acceptance inspection and test to verify that any new or substantially modernized equipment conforms to the latest codes and standards.

Elevator Inspection Companies are Independent Contractors that are required to be authorized by the local, State or national authority having jurisdiction. (According to ASME A17.1) Standards for being approved for authorization generally include verification of independence, current certification and appropriate liability insurance. In most Jurisdictions that use independent inspectors, the authority having jurisdiction authorizes multiple inspection companies to avoid concerns with anti-trust lawsuits (see: Professional Ambulance Service, Inc. v. Abramowitz, 328 N.Y.S.2d 467). To protect the interests of the public, authorities are responsible to verify that an inspection company maintains current QEI certification for inspectors (as applicable), provides proper safety equipment to employees, carrying general liability, errors and omissions insurance prior to authorization.

Violations of elevator, escalator and other conveyance safety codes may involve civil damages to property owners, and may include liability claims if those violations include personal injuries. Property Owners may incur additional liability, including civil and criminal penalties if it can be proven that they failed to properly maintain and/or meet the State or Provincial requirements for inspections of their conveyances, particularly if those claims are made that indicate negligence.

Verification by Users of Conveyances of proof of current inspection is generally the right of the public. Certification processes vary widely across jurisdictions, but in general, the riding public has a right to demand proof that a conveyance available to the public has met the Jurisdiction's standards for current inspections. In States enforcing the ICC International Property Maintenance Code, that right is explicitly stated in section 606.1. Recent attempts to make those certifications more easily accessible to the public were blocked by building owner associations, however the property maintenance code is unambiguous about the right of the riding public to verify current certifications are maintained.

External links
International Association of Elevator Consultants
list of qualified competitive inspection companies at City of Buffalo NY
ASME Certification
International Code Council adoption
NAESAI Code of Conduct
PM34-06/07

Consultant
Installation, maintenance, and repair occupations
Design occupations
Consulting occupations